The mayor of Leicester is responsible for the executive function of Leicester City Council in England. The incumbent is Peter Soulsby of the Labour Party.

Background
In December 2010 the Labour controlled Leicester City Council approved plans to give the city a directly elected mayor with responsibility for all council decisions during their four-year term and for selecting up to nine councillors as a supporting cabinet. The creation of the post was approved by Leicester City Council on 10 December 2010. A referendum on establishing a directly elected mayoralty was not held. The first election took place in May 2011.

Elections

2011
The first mayoral election on 5 May 2011 saw Peter Soulsby elected as mayor in the first round.

2015
Soulsby won re-election in 2015, again polling more than half the first preference vote to win on the first round.

2019
Again, Soulsby won re-election in 2019, retaining his position as City Mayor for a third term, with an increased majority.

List of mayors

References

Leicester
Leicester
Elections in Leicester
Leicester
Leicester-related lists